Golden Trout Creek is an approximately  long tributary of the Kern River, flowing in northeastern Tulare County, California.

The creek drains an area of the High Sierra Nevada in the Inyo National Forest. Volcano Creek is a tributary of it.

Course
It starts near  Cirque Peak and Siberian Pass as the confluence of several small streams in Big Whitney Meadow and flows south, turning west at the confluence of the South Fork.

Ecology
California's state fish, the Golden trout, are native to Golden Trout Creek. The high Volcano Falls located near the mouth of the creek prevents other trout species from the main Kern River from mixing with those in this creek.

See also
Golden Trout Wilderness Area
Kern River rainbow trout

References

Kern River
Rivers of the Sierra Nevada (United States)
Rivers of Tulare County, California
Tulare Basin watershed
Sequoia National Forest
Rivers of Northern California
Rivers of the Sierra Nevada in California